Beizhili, formerly romanized as , Pechili, Peichili, etc. and also known as North or Northern Zhili or Chih-li, was a historical province of the Ming Empire. Its capital was Beijing, from which it is also sometimes known as Beijing or Peking Province. Beizhili mostly covered the area of the Yuan province of Zhongshuthe "Central Administration"and took its own nameChinese for "Northern Directly Administered Area"from Beijing's status as the Ming's national capital following the Yongle Emperor move there from Nanjing, which oversaw Nanzhili or the Southern Directly Administered Area. During the early Qing Dynasty, Beizhili's name was shortened Zhili after Nanjing lost its status as a secondary capital. Under the Republic and People's Republic of China, it was divided into Hebei and the provincial-level municipalities of Beijing and Tianjin. (Small parts of what was once Beizhili were also ceded to Henan and Shandong.)

See also 
 Zhili & South Zhili
 Henan, Beijing, & Tianjin
 Bay & Gulf of Bohai, both formerly known as Pechili etc. from the nearby province

References 

Former administrative divisions of China
History of Beijing
History of Hebei